The 2015 Albanian Supercup was the 22nd edition of the Albanian Supercup, an annual Albanian football match played between the winner of the previous season's Albanian Superliga and the winner of the Albanian Cup. The match was contested by KF Skënderbeu Korçë, champions of the 2014–15 Albanian Superliga, and KF Laçi, the 2014–15 Albanian Cup winners. It was held at the Qemal Stafa Stadium on 12 August 2015. KF Laçi won the match 8–7 on penalties after regular and overtime game ended 2–2 draw. The game was watched by 2,200 spectators and was broadcast through DigitAlb's SuperSport Albania.

Details

See also

2014–15 Albanian Superliga
2014–15 Albanian Cup

Notes

References

2015
Albanian Supercup, 2015
Albanian Supercup, 2015
Supercup